Theodor Koritzinsky (born 2 November 1941) is a Norwegian academic and politician for the Socialist Left Party.

He was chairman of the Socialist Youth League from 1965 to 1966. He later joined the Socialist Left Party, and was their chairman from 1983 to 1987. He was elected to the Norwegian Parliament from Oslo in 1985, and was re-elected on one occasion.

He is currently associate professor in the pedagogy of social sciences at Oslo University College.

Koritzinsky was born in Trondheim, and completed his examen artium at Oslo Cathedral School in 1961.

References

External links
 Theo Koritzinsky Luge-profiles at The-sports.org season 1955/56 and season 1957/58

1941 births
Living people
Members of the Storting
Socialist Left Party (Norway) politicians
Politicians from Oslo
Politicians from Trondheim
Academic staff of Oslo University College
People educated at Oslo Cathedral School
20th-century Norwegian politicians
Norwegian male lugers